Heho is a small town in Kalaw Township, Taunggyi District, Shan State of Myanmar (formerly Burma). It is the primary air gateway to tourist areas such as Inle Lake.

Heho is connected by NH4 to Sakangyi and Taunggyi, the capital of the Shan State in the east. A dirt road northwest from Heho leads to the old silver-lead mines of Maw Son (Baw Zaing).

Climate

History
It was a small village of Danu people. The village grew into a town in the 1920s when the single-line railway line was extended from Aungpan to Shwenyaung, and Heho was determined to be a convenient intermediate stop and transfer point. The airport served as an airbase both for the Allies and the Japanese during World War II. The airbase was heavily bombed by the Allies. Evidence of aircraft bunker revetments and bomb craters can still be seen on the southern end of the airfield, especially noticeable from the air.

References

Populated places in Taunggyi District
Kalaw Township